Bairabi is a census town in Kolasib district  in the state of Mizoram, India.  It is also the railhead of Mizoram, 117 km from the Capital, Aizawl.

Demographics 

Males constitute 50.4% of the population and females 49.6%. Bairabi has an average literacy rate of 90.8%. 17.5% of the population is under age of six.

Connectivity 
Bairabi is one of the railhead of Mizoram, connected with a broad gauge line. Katakhal-Bairabi metre gauge track was converted to broad gauge, having got the status of national project, it was fast tracked and completed on 21 March 2016. On completion this will be extended to Sairang. The Bairabi-Sairang (Sihhmui) railway line will cover 40 km within Kolasib district and 11 km within Aizawl district. The Bairabi railway station serves as the station to access the railway line.

Economy
The main employers in Bairabi besides Agriculture are :
Food Corporation of India Godown(F.C.I) Store house of Food Supplies
Bairabi Thermal Power Station - Heavy Fuel Oil Based producing 22.92MW
Modern Brick Industry, Bairabi.
Bairabi Dam.
Bairabi Sairang Railway line from Bairabi to Sairang, a town near Aizawl is also under construction.

References

External links 
 Bairabi Photos

Cities and towns in Kolasib district